The Guthrie Historic District (GHD) is a National Historic Landmark District encompassing the commercial core of Guthrie, Oklahoma, US.  According to its National Historic Landmark Nomination it is roughly bounded by Oklahoma Avenue on the north, Broad Street on the east, Harrison Avenue on the south, and the railroad tracks on the west; it also includes 301 W. Harrison Avenue.  The National Historic Landmarks Program on-line document describes the boundaries as "14th Street, College Avenue, Pine Street and Lincoln Avenue. One building, the Logan County Courthouse, is at 301 E. Harrison Avenue, outside the main boundaries of the GHD," This article relies on the former source, which is more detailed. According to the 1998 nomination, the proposed district covered . The nomination included 112 resources, classed as 69 contributing buildings, 38 non-contributing buildings, 1  non-contributing structure and 3 noncontributing objects. It was declared a National Historic Landmark in 1999 for its historic significance as the first capital of the Oklahoma Territory and of Oklahoma.

Period of significance
The period of significance is defined as 1889 to 1910, when most of the contributing buildings were erected. The most notable architect at the time was Joseph Pierre Foucart, who designed many of the buildings in the table below.  The city of Guthrie was founded in 1889 in the wake of the Land Rush of 1889 which opened lands of the Indian Territory to white settlement.  Guthrie promptly became the capital of the Oklahoma Territory. When Oklahoma became a state on November 16, 1907, Guthrie became the first state capital, a role it held until 1910, when the seat of government moved to Oklahoma City. Guthrie thereafter declined in commercial importance and changed little for many years. The GHD was assessed to have a high degree of historic integrity.

Architectural styles
Late Victorian
Italianate
Romanesque
Late 19th & Early 20th Century Revivals
Beaux Arts
Classical Revival
Late 19th & Early 20th Century American Movements
Commercial Style

The district includes buildings separately listed on the National Register of Historic Places, including:
Carnegie Library
Co-operative Publishing Company Building
Logan County Courthouse

Building classifications
As part of the application process, all of the significant buildings within the proposed district boundaries were labeled as either "Contributing" or "non-contributing". Buildings in the former category had to meet the following criteria:
Built between 1893 and 1910;
Had not lost their historical character through remodeling or conversion to other uses

The table presented here identifies the buildings contained by the GHD, as defined in the NRHP application. Data are largely derived from text descriptions in the application.

See also
List of National Historic Landmarks in Oklahoma
National Register of Historic Places listings in Logan County, Oklahoma

References

Further reading
National Historic Landmark Nomination: Guthrie Historic District. 1998.

External links

 Encyclopedia of Oklahoma History and Culture - Guthrie Historic District

National Historic Landmarks in Oklahoma
Geography of Logan County, Oklahoma
Victorian architecture in Oklahoma
Neoclassical architecture in Oklahoma
Guthrie, Oklahoma
Historic districts on the National Register of Historic Places in Oklahoma
National Register of Historic Places in Logan County, Oklahoma